The Cambridge Studies in Medieval Life and Thought is a book series on medieval life and thought published by Cambridge University Press. The series was initiated by G.G. Coulton in 1921 and is now on its fourth series which is edited by Rosamond McKitterick.

References

Cambridge University Press books
Series of history books
1921 establishments in the United Kingdom